5.....GO is an album by South Korean rock band F.T. Island. It was released on 13 May 2015. The album was released to celebrate the band's fifth anniversary in Japan. The title track "Primavera" is a collaboration with Japanese rock singer Takahiro Moriuchi from One Ok Rock.

Track list

References

F.T. Island albums
2015 albums
Japanese-language albums
FNC Entertainment albums